This is a list of Presbyterian Church in Canada churches in Toronto, Ontario, Canada.

Introduction

In 1925, about 70% of Presbyterian churches across Canada joined the new United Church of Canada, although the split in Toronto was closer to 50-50. This is a list of churches within the present boundaries of Toronto that have been part of The Presbyterian Church in Canada since June 1925.

Presbyterial oversight

The Presbytery of Toronto has been an Ecclesiastical District (in Presbyterian Polity, known as a Presbytery), since the formation of the City in 1834, by all the groups that led to the formation of the PCC in 1875. The bounds in 1875 spread north and west to include Oakville, Milton, Georgetown, Brampton, King Township, Newmarket and Sutton West. In 1883, Melville, West Hill was dismissed to the neighbouring Presbytery of Whitby, as it was linked from 1883 to 1900 with Dunbarton (now United) Church in Pickering Township. In 1925, Melville, Whitby, Ashburn, and Oshawa were added to the Toronto Presbytery.

On January 1, 1949, Toronto Presbytery was divided into East Toronto and West Toronto, with Bathurst Street the dividing line, putting flagship congregations of Knox, Toronto and St. Andrew's, Toronto along with Knox College into East Toronto.
In 1963, St. Andrew's in Hamilton Bermuda was added to West Toronto, and the congregations west of Toronto and York County boundaries were dismissed to Brampton Presbytery a couple of years later.
In January 1990, The Presbytery of Pickering was formed from East Toronto congregations east of Victoria Park Avenue in the then City of Scarborough, and adding 4 Durham Region congregation (all part of the pre-1925 Whitby Presbytery).
In 1993, Oak Ridges Presbytery was erected, and the East and West Toronto Presbyteries were confined to Toronto (and Bermuda) alone.
In 1998, the Han-Ca East Presbytery was erected, consisting of Korean congregations from Ontario to Halifax.

The List

See also
List of Anglican churches in Toronto
List of Orthodox churches in Toronto
List of United Church of Canada churches in Toronto
List of Roman Catholic churches in Toronto
List of Synagogues in Toronto
List of cemeteries in Toronto

References
Broken link to Churches in the Presbytery of East Toronto
Broken link to Churches in the Presbytery of West Toronto
Broken link to Churches in the Presbytery of Pickering
Broken link to Churches in the Han-Ca East Presbytery

Presbyterian
Churches, Presbyterian
 
Toronto, Presbyterian
Christianity in Ontario